The 2020 Israeli legislative election was held using closed list proportional representation. Each party presented a list of candidates to the Central Elections Committee prior to the election. If a list contains more than 40 people, only the first 40 are shown.

Blue and White
The Blue and White list was headed by Benny Gantz.

 Benny Gantz (Resilience)
 Yair Lapid (Yesh Atid)
 Moshe Ya'alon (Telem)
 Gabi Ashkenazi (Independent)
 Avi Nissenkorn (Resilience)
 Meir Cohen (Yesh Atid)
 Miki Haimovich (Resilience)
 Ofer Shelah (Yesh Atid)
 Yoaz Hendel (Telem)
 Orna Barbivai (Yesh Atid)
 Michael Biton (Resilience)
 Hili Tropper (Resilience)
 Yael German (Yesh Atid)
 Zvi Hauser (Telem)
 Orit Farkash-Hacohen (Resilience)
 Karin Elharar (Yesh Atid)
 Meirav Cohen (Resilience)
 Yoel Razvozov (Yesh Atid)
 Asaf Zamir (Resilience)
 Yizhar Shai (Resilience)
 Elazar Stern (Yesh Atid)
 Mickey Levy (Yesh Atid)
 Omer Yankelevich (Resilience)
 Pnina Tamano-Shata (Yesh Atid)
 Gadeer Mreeh (Resilience)
 Ram Ben-Barak (Yesh Atid)
 Alon Schuster (Resilience)
 Yoav Segalovich (Yesh Atid)
 Ram Shefa (Resilience)
 Boaz Toporovsky (Yesh Atid)
 Orly Fruman (Telem)
 Eitan Ginzburg (Resilience)
 Andrey Kozhinov (Telem)
 Idan Roll (Yesh Atid)
 Yorai Lahav-Hertzano (Yesh Atid)
 Michal Cotler-Wunsh (Telem)
 Einav Kabla (Resilience)
 Tehila Friedman (Yesh Atid)
 Hila Vazan (Resilience)
 Yael Ron Ben-Moshe (Resilience)
 Vladimir Beliak (Yesh Atid)
 Moshe Tur-Paz (Yesh Atid)
 Ruth Wasserman Lande (Resilience)
Anat Knafo (Yesh Atid)

Joint List
The Joint List list is headed by Ayman Odeh.

 Ayman Odeh (Hadash)
 Mtanes Shehadeh (Balad)
 Ahmad Tibi (Ta'al)
 Mansour Abbas (Ra'am)
 Aida Touma-Suleiman (Hadash)
 Walid Taha (Ra'am)
 Ofer Cassif (Hadash)
 Heba Yazbak (Balad)
 Osama Saadi (Ta'al)
 Yousef Jabareen (Hadash)
 Said al-Harumi (Ra'am)
 Jabar Asakla (Hadash)
 Sami Abu Shehadeh (Balad)
 Sondos Saleh (Ta'al)
 Iman Khatib-Yasin (Ra'am)
 Youssef Atauna (Hadash)

Labor-Gesher-Meretz
The Labor-Gesher-Meretz list is headed by Amir Peretz.

 Amir Peretz (Labor)
 Orly Levy (Gesher)
 Nitzan Horowitz (Meretz)
 Tamar Zandberg (Meretz)
 Itzik Shmuli (Labor)
 Merav Michaeli (Labor)
 Yair Golan (Meretz)
 Ilan Gilon (Meretz)
 Omer Bar-Lev (Labor)
 Revital Swid (Labor)
 Issawi Frej (Meretz)
 Haggai Reznik (Gesher)
 Eran Hermoni (Labor)
 Mossi Raz (Meretz)
 Emilie Moatti (Labor)

Likud
The Likud list is headed by Benjamin Netanyahu.

 Benjamin Netanyahu
 Yuli Edelstein
 Israel Katz
 Gilad Erdan
 Gideon Sa'ar
 Miri Regev
 Yariv Levin
 Yoav Galant
 Nir Barkat
 Gila Gamliel
 Avi Dichter
 Ze'ev Elkin
 Haim Katz
 Eli Cohen
 Tzachi Hanegbi
 Ofir Akunis
 Yuval Steinitz
 Tzipi Hotovely
 Dudi Amsalem
 Gadi Yevarkan
 Amir Ohana
 Ofir Katz
 Eti Atiya
 Yoav Kisch
 David Bitan
 Keren Barak
 Shlomo Karhi
 Miki Zohar
 Yifat Shasha-Biton
 Sharren Haskel
 Michal Shir
 Keti Shitrit
 Fateen Mulla
 May Golan
 Tali Ploskov
 Uzi Dayan
 Ariel Kallner
 Osnat Mark
 Amit Halevi
 Nissim Vaturi
 Shevah Stern
 Ayoob Kara
 Matti Yogev
 Yehuda Glick
 Nurit Koren

Shas
The Shas list is headed by Aryeh Deri.

 Aryeh Deri
 Yitzhak Cohen
 Meshulam Nahari
 Ya'akov Margi
 Yoav Ben-Tzur
 Michael Malchieli
 Moshe Arbel
 Yinon Azulai
 Moshe Abutbul
 Uriel Buso

United Torah Judaism
The United Torah Judaism list is headed by Yaakov Litzman.

 Yaakov Litzman (Agudat Yisrael)
 Moshe Gafni (Degel HaTorah)
 Meir Porush (Agudat Yisrael)
 Uri Maklev (Degel HaTorah)
 Ya'akov Tessler (Agudat Yisrael)
 Ya'akov Asher (Degel HaTorah)
 Yisrael Eichler (Agudat Yisrael)
 Yitzhak Pindros (Degel HaTorah)
 Eliyahu Hasid (Agudat Yisrael)
 Eliyahu Baruchi (Degel HaTorah)

Yamina
The Yamina list is headed by Naftali Bennett.

Naftali Bennett (New Right)
Rafi Peretz (The Jewish Home)
Ayelet Shaked (New Right) 
Bezalel Smotrich (National Union)
Matan Kahana (New Right)
Ofir Sofer (National Union)
Idit Silman (New Right)
Sara Beck (Ahi)
Shirly Pinto (New Right)
Orit Strook (National Union)
Moti Yogev (The Jewish Home)
Shuli Mualem (New Right)
Yossi Cohen (The Jewish Home)
Shai Maimon (New Right)
Eli Ben-Dahan (The Jewish Home)
Ronnie Sassover (New Right)
Yomtob Kalfon (New Right)

Yisrael Beiteinu
The Yisrael Beiteinu list is headed by Avigdor Lieberman.

 Avigdor Lieberman
 Oded Forer
 Evgeny Sova
 Eli Avidar
 Yulia Malinovsky
 Hamad Amar
 Alex Kushnir
 Mark Ifraimov
 Limor Magen Telem
 Elina Bardach-Yalov
 Shadi Halul
 Alex Fridman
 David Davidyan
 Shahar Alon
 Olivier Rafowicz

Minor parties 
Minor parties in the order in which they registered with the Central Elections Committee.

HaHazon (The Vision) (צדק בראשות אבי ילאו)
Ani VeAta (Me and You) (כבוד ושוויון)
Otzma Liberalit Kalkalit (Liberal Economic Power) (עוצמה ליברלית כלכלית)
Da'am: Green Economy – One State  (דעם - כלכלה ירוקה מדינה אחת)
Bible Bloc Party (Gush HaTanachi) (מפלגת הגוש התנ"כי)
Zekhuyoteinu BeKoleinu ("Our Rights Are in Our Vote/Voice") (זכויותנו בקולנו - לחיים בכבוד)
HaLev HaYehudi (The Jewish Heart) (הלוי היהודי)
Mishpat Tzedek (Fair Trial) (משפט צדק)
Social Leadership (מנהיגות חברתית)
Mitkademet (Leader) (מתקדמת)
Kol HaNashim (Voice the Women) (קול הנשים)
Seder Hadash (סדר חדש - לשינוי שיטת הבחירות)
Peula LeYisrael (Action for Israel) (פעולה למען ישראל)
Pirate Party (Piratim) (הפיראטים - כי כולנו באותה סירה והכל אותו שייט)
Uncorrupted Red White (אדום לבן - לגליזציה לקנביס, שוויון לאתיופים, ערבים ומקופחים)
 Kama – Advancing the Status of the Individual (קמ"ה - קידום מעמד הפרט)
 HaBrit HaMeshutefet (The United Covenant)(מאוחד ברית)
 Kavod HaAdam (Respect for People) (כבוד האדם)
 Shema (Listen) (להקשיב)
Tzomet (צומת - התיישבות וחקלאות)
Koah Lehashpi'a (The Power to Influence) (כוחו של השפעה)
Otzma Yehudit (Jewish Strength) (עוצמה יהודית)

References

2020